Lake in the Hills (often abbreviated L.I.T.H. or LITH) is a village in McHenry County, Illinois, United States. As of the 2020 census, the population was 28,982.

The village is most known for its rampant residential growth which occurred most heavily in the 1990s. Once a sleepy lakeside village of cottages and small ranches, its population skyrocketed as developers flocked to the area in the 1990s. Its population increased by 17,000 people (a nearly 400% increase) over this period, making it one of the most rapidly growing suburbs of Chicago and in the United States at that time. At the height of its building boom, the village issued over 1,000 residential building permits in 1995.

In the late 1990s, the village faced the challenge of providing adequate services and infrastructure as well as establishing an identity and community unity, since many community services (libraries, schools, fire districts) were pre-delegated to neighboring communities such as Huntley, Algonquin and Crystal Lake. However, the village continues to expand its resources and community offerings and is also endeavoring to diversify its tax base and provide more commercial and industrial businesses.

Geography
Lake in the Hills is located at  (42.186729, -88.347429).

History 

Lake in the Hills was started in 1923 by Federal Judge Walter J. La Buy around Woods Creek Lake, which is the main lake in Lake in the Hills. By the year 1926, La Buy bought  of land which is currently Indian Trail. On this land, he built five stucco homes; only one stands in its original state, which is currently owned by the Village of Lake in the Hills. The other four original stucco homes have been altered in some way, but all still stand in the original spot by Woods Creek Lake.

The early days of Lake in the Hills saw vacationers from the Chicago area, who wanted to spend some time away from the hustle and bustle of the city. By 1950, some of the vacationers became year-round residents of Lake in the Hills. On November 29, 1952, the Village of Lake in the Hills was formed.

The village of Lake in the Hills remained a small, close-knit lakeside residential community for much of the 20th Century, relying on nearby towns like Algonquin and Crystal Lake for services. In 1987, the Village's first shopping center was constructed; it was built at the intersection of Algonquin Road and Oakleaf Road±. In the late 1980s and early 1990s, the Village made a series of large annexations extending west of Randall Road, all the way west to Illinois Route 47. Numerous subdivisions were constructed in this area throughout the 1990s and 2000s (decade) and retail development blossomed along Randall Road during this time period as well. By the mid 2000s (decade), development had slowed down and as the Village became landlocked by other municipalities, it worked to appropriately develop its remaining parcels.

In 2023, the town was in national news when it was the site of vicious, unrelenting attacks against a bakery.

Demographics

2020 census

2010 Census
As of the 2010 Census, there were 28,965 people, 9,544 households, and 7,567 families residing in the village. The racial makeup of the village (including Hispanics) was 86.72% White, 2% Black or African American, 0.26% Native American, 5.24% Asian, 0.04% Pacific Islander, 3.62% from other races, and 2.13% from two or more races. Hispanic or Latino of any race were 11.59% of the population.

There were 9,544 households, out of which 47.8% had children under the age of 18 living with them, 66.7% were married couples living together, 8.6% had a female householder with no husband present, and 20.7% were non-families. 16% of all households were made up of individuals, and 2.7% had someone living alone who was 65 years of age or older. The average household size was 3.03 and the average family size was 3.44.

In the village, the population was spread out, with 31.6% under the age of 18, 6.7% from 18 to 24, 33.4% from 25 to 44, 23.2% from 45 to 64, and 5.2% who were 65 years of age or older. The median age was 33.9 years. For every 100 females, there were 98.9 males. For every 100 females age 18 and over, there were 96.5 males.

For 2015, the median income for a household in the village was $84,300, and the median income for a family was $89,035. Full-time, year-round working males had a median income of $64,725 versus $45,811 for females. The per capita income for the village was $32,957. About 3.9% of families and 5.7% of the population were below the poverty line, including 8.3% of those under age 18 and 2.8% of those age 65 or over.

Neighborhoods 

The heart and soul of Lake in the Hills is considered by many to be the collection of older neighborhoods colloquially dubbed the "Old Section". For many L.I.T.H. natives, the Old Section is considered the "true" Lake in the Hills, as it contains the lake and the hills from which the town derives its name. The Old Section is unique for its eclectic appearance, as opposed to the newer neighborhoods more homogeneous tract style. Within the Old Section there are four main neighborhoods. These four neighborhoods are as follows: the Original section, the Indian section, the Tree section, and the Presidents section. All, besides the Original section, derive their names from the street names of the area. So the Presidents section contains streets named after presidents, the Indian section of Indian tribes, and the Tree section of different species of trees. The Original section is dubbed so because it is where most of the early settlement took place.
Aside from the village's older section, the village has developed several neighborhoods, especially due to the rise of subdivisions in the village over the past 15 years.

Princeton Crossing, located along Ackman and Lakewood Road, is the area's most pristine townhome community. This neighborhood consists of 67 townhomes and plush landscaping.
Prairie Point, located along Cunat Court is a neighborhood on the village's eastern side, just west of Pyott Road.  It included 3-story condominium buildings and a neighborhood recreational center and pool.
Boulder Ridge is a gated community in the central section of town, north of Algonquin Road, south of Miller Road and east of Frank Road.  It features homes worth between $400,000 and $1,000,000.  It also includes the village's only 18 hole golf course, and an immaculate country club which is a popular spot for banquets.  On the west side of Frank Road, is the child development "The Lakes of Boulder Ridge", which offers a 9-hole golf course, scenic setting, and expensive duplex homes.
Big Sky and Harvest Gate are neighborhoods just west of Randall Road and south of Miller Road, just east of Boulder Ridge.  They are some of the village's first subdivisions and were built by the same developer, Town and Country Homes.  Woods Creek divides them.  Big Sky Park, the new Lake in the Hills Village Hall, and Lincoln Prairie Elementary School are all located within these neighborhoods.
Spring Lake Farm (north) is a subdivision south of Miller Road, west of Frank Road.  It was also among the village's first subdivisions, built c. early 1990s, by Sundance Homes and Americana Homes.  It includes both single-family and multi-family homes.
Spring Lake Farm (south) is a single-family home subdivision built by Sundance Homes on Algonquin Road, west of Lakewood and immediately east of Tom's Farm Market in Huntley. It was the village's first subdivision west of Lakewood Road.  Homes in this neighborhood are valued generally in the $200K range.
Bellchase is a neighborhood built by Sundance Homes on the village's only parcel south of Algonquin Road.  This neighborhood features Bellchase Commons, LeRoy Guy Park, and a full range of homes, from 2- and 3-bedroom duplexes and smaller 2-story "freedom" homes to large 4- and 5-bedroom homes.  Duplexes in this neighborhood are valued from the high $100s, single-family homes are priced from the mid $200s to the mid $300s.
Sumner Glen and Provence are neighborhoods built by Town and Country Homes.  They are located along the western side of Lakewood Road from Algonquin Road to Miller Road.  Normandy Park and Exner Marsh Nature Preserve along Reed Road serve as this area's centerpiece.  Provence features slightly smaller homes, including both ranches and two-stories, valued generally in the $200K range.  Sumner Glen features more expensive homes, some with 5-6 bedrooms, valued generally in the $300K range.
Heron Bay is a small neighborhood featuring slightly upscale homes starting in the low $300s.  It backs up to the Exner Marsh and features a very large pond with multiple fountains.
Meadowbrook is the village's most expansive neighborhood.  Located in the northwest part of the village, along Miller, Lakewood, and Haligus Roads, it is anchored by Sunset Park and features several smaller neighborhoods within.  Impressions is a duplex-style home community, Summit Ridge is a small neighborhood of exclusive homes, Sunrise and Drake Park are moderately priced neighborhoods featuring one and two-story homes, and Regatta is a neighborhood featuring smaller one-story and two-story homes.  Concord Hills, however, was the first community and is located just east of Lakewood Road, north of Miller Road.
At the southeast corner of Lakewood and Ackman Roads is the Cheswick Place subdivision, built by Orleans Homes. The neighborhood consists of over 100 single family homes, with retail and small office buildings, a small market and a gas station to the northeast. This neighborhood has a small, operating cornfield fronting its main entrance on Ackman Road. This neighborhood is bordered by Ackman Road to the north, Lakewood Road to the west, The Impressions neighborhood and a wetland to the south, and Swanson Road to the east. It has 2 village-owned parks and a small non-village gazebo park with a short paved bike path.
Fox Ridge Farm, a planned subdivision of potentially 200-300 homes located on the village's western fringe along Illinois Route 47, is currently under development review.  Once constructed, it will likely be the last major subdivision developed in the village, as Lake in the Hills has become landlocked by other municipalities.
 The old neighborhoods are primarily in the original section of the town. This consists of all homes residing in the original development of the town. This is usually considered, by locals, to include all homes built within an area of close to the actual lake. It is widely recognized that if a home is within a short walking distance of the lake, the police station, or the fire department, that said home is one of the original homes in the town.

Education
The village is served by four school districts. Consolidated School District 158 serves a majority of the village, covering its densely populated western half.  School District 300 serves the older sections of town on the eastern side, and Elementary School District 47 and Community High School District 155 serve the a small portion of the central sections of the village.

Elementary schools
Elementary Schools serving Lake in the Hills include:
Lake in the Hills Elementary School serves students residing on the eastern side of town
Lincoln Prairie Elementary School serves students residing in District 300 boundaries in the central sections of town near Randall Road.
Glacier Ridge Elementary School, Canterbury Elementary School, Woods Creek Elementary School and Indian Prairie Elementary School (in Crystal Lake, Illinois) serves students residing in District 47 boundaries in the central sections of town along Miller Road.
May Chesak and Hannah Martin Elementary Schools serve students residing in District 158 boundaries on the western side of town, along the Lakewood Road corridor.  They are located in the Reed Road Campus.
Mackeben and Marion Conley Elementary Schools serve students residing in District 158 boundaries on the southwest side of town (generally the Bellchase neighborhood).  They are located on the Square Barn Road Campus in Algonquin, IL

Middle schools
Middle Schools serving Lake in the Hills include:
Westfield Community School in Algonquin, IL serves students residing in District 300 boundaries.
Richard F. Bernotas Middle School and Leon J. Lundahl Middle School in Crystal Lake, IL serves students residing in District 47 boundaries.
Henry Marlowe Middle School in Lake in the Hills serves students residing in District 158 boundaries north of Algonquin Road and west of Lakewood Road.
Bernice Heinemann Middle School in Algonquin, IL serves students residing in District 158 boundaries south of Algonquin Road and east of Lakewood Road.

High schools
High Schools serving Lake in the Hills include:
Huntley High School in Huntley, IL serves students residing in District 158 boundaries
Harry D. Jacobs High School in Algonquin, IL serves students residing in District 300 boundaries
Crystal Lake South High School and Crystal Lake Central High School in Crystal Lake, IL serves students residing in District 155 boundaries

All four high schools are in the Fox Valley Conference and are major rivals of each other.

Community colleges
McHenry County College in Crystal Lake and Elgin Community College in Elgin are the community colleges that serve the village.

Libraries
Huntley Area Public Library serves residents in the western sections of the village while Algonquin Area Public Library District serves residents in the eastern sections of the village.

Recreation
Even though Huntley Park District serves the village's western parts, Lake in the Hills maintains its own 34 parks and recreation department within village limits and provides immense programs and diverse types of parks and recreational areas.  Significant recreational areas include:

Sunset Park, one of the village's largest parks located on Miller Road on the western side of the village.  The park features several baseball and softball fields, soccer fields, playground equipment, picnic shelters, tennis courts, a basketball court, a gazebo, a splash pad and a skate park.  This is also the site of one of the village's famous summer activities, the Summer Sunset Fest held over Labor Day weekend.
Bark Park, located just west of Sunset, is one of the area's only dog parks and serves registered users in the village as a place for their dogs to run and interact with each other.
Leroy Guy Park, located in the Bellchase neighborhood on the village's southwest side on Lakewood Road, features several ballfields, playground equipment, tennis and basketball courts, and a picnic shelter.
Exner Marsh is a recreational area operated by the McHenry County Conservation District on the village's western side which has a decent trail system, public washrooms, tallgrass prairies, lakes and swampland, and significant stands of trees.  It features one of the state of Illinois' few groups of Blanding's turtles.
Boulder Ridge Golf Course and Country Club is a private golf course located in the village's most expensive neighborhood in the central part of town.
Richard Taylor Park & Skate Park, located behind the Lake in the Hills police department has soccer fields and a fenced-in skate park.
The Lake in the Hills Fen is a  natural prairie and recreational area on the village's northeast side of town off Pyott Road.  It features immense tallgrass prairie and hundreds of species of wildlife, many of them considered to be rare or endangered.
Woods Creek Lake is the village's lake located in the eastern part of town.  It includes several beaches, boat launches, and adjacent recreational areas.  The village's oldest homes, several of them cottages, are grouped around this lake. There are 5 properties maintained by the village along the lake and that is: Turtle Island Park, Labahn Hain House/Nockels park, Echo Hill Park, Indian Trail Beach, and Butch Hagele Beach. 
Lynn Dillow Is part of the sub-division Spring Lake Farms and is the home to 2 jungle gyms, a gazebo, basketball court, and a bike obstacle course.
Ken Carpenter Park is located at the corner of Randall Rd and Miller Rd. The park was updated in summer of 2018 and features a basketball court, beach volleyball, and trail that leads into the surrounding neighborhood. 
Ryder Park - Home of 3 baseball fields formally used by the LITHYAA. The playground was updated in summer of 2018. 
Barbara Key Park is off Pyott Rd behind the Cunat Apartments. There is a playground, beach volleyball court, basketball court, and a trail that leads into the conservation district.

Shopping
The village is located along the northern fringe of the Randall Road corridor, one of the most sought-after retail corridors in the Chicago metropolitan area.  As a result, the village has a good portion of its retail in this section.  The village's other major retail area is along Algonquin Road.

The Centre is a shopping center located at the northeast corner of Randall and Algonquin.  It features AMC Lake in the Hills 12 Movie Theater, Tommy's Red Hots, Taco Bell, White Castle, Applebee's, Yumz Gourmet Frozen Yogurt, Jersey Mike's Subs, Little Caesars, Noodles and Company, Compassionate Dental Care, Woods Creek Tavern, Starbucks, Einstein Bros. Bagels, GNC, H & R Block, Coldstone Creamery, Chen King Wok, Home State Bank, and several smaller shops.
Acorn Plaza includes Ace Hardware, Fast Frame, and Papa Saverio's Pizza.
Randall Plaza is a shopping center located at the northwest corner of Randall and Algonquin.  It is anchored by Walgreens. Sears Hardware recently vacated the site, but was recently converted into a multi-tenant building featuring Sherwin-Williams, Loves Liquor, and O'Reilly Auto Parts.  Other stores include Nancy's Pizza, Let's Travel, Hair Cuttery, Cigarettes Cheaper, Currency Exchange, and RadioShack
An unnamed center located just north of Randall Plaza includes Moretti's Ristorante, Costco, Lowe's, Athletico, a coffee house, Chase Bank, and Arby's.
An older shopping center located just north of Algonquin Road features the Algonquin/Lake in the Hills Chamber of Commerce, Nationwide Insurance, a Citgo gas station, Lily Garden restaurant, Castle Bank, Pizza Hut express, Tacos El Norte, and smaller stores.
Bellchase Commons, located at the southeast corner of Algonquin Road and Lakewood Road is a neighborhood center serving the village's western residents.  It includes a 7-Eleven / Citgo, Castle Bank, La Petite Children's Academy, Alfredo's Pizza, H & R Block, Bistro Wasabi, Dairy Queen, Butcher on the Block, a dental office, Hometown Eyecare, a State Farm Insurance agent, and other smaller stores.

Community activities and traditions
Rockin' Rotary Ribfest is a village event showcasing food, live music, and more, held at the village's Sunset Park in early July.
Summer Sunset Festival is the village's main festival.  Held at Sunset Park on the village's west side, it features live music, food, a carnival, and a fireworks display.  It is usually held on Labor Day weekend.
The village has always been a main participant in National Night Out and uses this as an opportunity for positive resident-police interaction, community block parties, and other activities to encourage community and prevent crime
Summer Sunset Idol, a spinoff of American Idol, which allows aspiring amateur performers to showcase their talents.  There are three rounds, spread out over the summer at the village's main summer events.
Community Oriented Police Programs
A number of concerts held throughout the year at a small amphitheater near Village Hall.
Youth athletic programs such as the Lake In the Hills/Algonquin Falcons youth football and cheerleading program, Golden Eagles Wrestling club, Algonquin/Lake In The Hills youth soccer league, the Lake In The Hills Youth Athletic Association, which runs the recreational baseball and softball leagues as well as the primary travel baseball (Thunder) and travel softball (Hurricanes) programs.

Transportation
The village of Lake in the Hills owns and operates Lake in the Hills Airport, a general aviation airport serving the greater McHenry County area.  It is located on Pyott Road in the far northern reaches of the village.
Randall Road, a major four-lane county highway, is the primary north-south highway in the Village.  It is known as the major divider separating the old part (or "East Side" of Lake in the Hills) from the newer part (or "West Side") of the Village.  Randall Road contains the bulk of the village's retail and restaurants and traffic on the corridor averages 50,000 vehicles per day. The Pace bus runs from Elgin to Crystal Lake during the day. 
Algonquin Road is the primary east-west artery in the Village.  It is also the dividing line separating Lake in the Hills from nearby Algonquin.  Like Randall Road, this county highway is also four lanes for the entire length of the village.  Both residential areas and retail areas can be found along the road.
Lakewood Road is a north-south county-highway on the Village's western side.  It is two lanes with left and right turn lanes.  Several of the village's subdivisions can be found along the road, in addition to the Exner Marsh conservation area.
Miller Road is an east-west village road.  The entire stretch of road is lined with subdivisions.  Sunset Park can also be found on the road, which winds through the Meadowbrook subdivision in the western part of the Village.  The road is slated to be expanded westward to Illinois Route 47 in the near future.
Pyott Road is a county highway which runs north-south through the eastern part of the Village.  Lake in the Hills Airport, the Lake in the Hills Fen, residential areas, and industrial businesses can all be found along the road.
Illinois Route 31 is a state highway which runs north-south along the village's eastern limits.  Much of the village's parcels along this highway are industrial areas.
Other important roads in the village include Crystal Lake Road, Hilltop Road, Oak Street, Frank Road, Reed Road, Albrecht Road, Annandale Drive, Ackman Road, and Haligus Road.

Notable people
 Joe Becker, musician
 Josh Caterer, singer-songwriter, guitarist, and frontman for the Smoking Popes
 Kaleb Rainwater, scientist

References

External links
Lake in the Hills official website

Villages in McHenry County, Illinois
Villages in Illinois
Chicago metropolitan area
Populated places established in 1952
1952 establishments in Illinois